The Jamaica Pegasus Hotel is a hotel in Kingston, Jamaica, located at 81 Knutsford Boulevard in the financial and business district of the city. A noted landmark, the hotel is 17 stories high.

See also
 List of hotels in Jamaica

References

External links
Official website  

Hotels in Jamaica
Buildings and structures in Kingston, Jamaica
Hotels established in 1973
Hotel buildings completed in 1973